Baron Coote is a title that has been created twice in the Peerage of Ireland, both on the same day and both for members of the Coote family.

The title of Baron Coote, of Castle Cuffe in the Queen's County, was created on 6 September 1660 for Sir Charles Coote, 2nd Baronet, who was made Earl of Mountrath at the same time. For further history of this creation, see Coote baronets.

The title of Lord Coote, Baron of Coloony, in the Queen's County, was created on 6 September 1660 for Richard Coote, younger brother of the first Earl of Mountrath. For more information on this creation, see Earl of Bellomont.

Coote family
Noble titles created in 1660
Extinct baronies in the Peerage of Ireland